Verapaz or Vera Paz was a historical region in the Spanish colonial Captaincy General of Guatemala.
Historical regions

Present day
The Verapaz region is currently divided into three Departments of Guatemala and four (three full, one partial) Districts of Belize:
 Alta Verapaz Department —  capital city, Cobán.
 Baja Verapaz Department — capital city, Salamá.
 Izabal Department - capital city, Puerto Barrios.
 Toledo District - capital city, Punta Gorda.
 Stann Creek District - capital city, Dangriga.
 Cayo District - capital city, San Ignacio.
 (part of) Belize District - capital city, Belize.

References

Colonial Guatemala
Geography of Guatemala
Alta Verapaz Department
Baja Verapaz Department
Regions of Central America